Richard E. Cohen is a journalist and author. He is a congressional correspondent for POLITICO.

Awards and honors
He received the Everett McKinley Dirksen Award for distinguished reporting on Congress in 1990. Cohen also received the Sigma Delta Chi and Washington-Baltimore Newspaper Guild Awards for his investigative reporting.

Career
Cohen also works as a weekly columnist for The Washington Post where he is responsible for writing on domestic and foreign politics. He began working for The Post in 1968 as a reporter. During this time, his work focused on police, city hall, education, state government, and national politics. He later worked as the chief Maryland correspondent where he covered the investigation of former Vice President Spiro Agnew. In 1976, Cohen wrote a column for The Post which was published in the Metro section. In 1981, his column was nationally syndicated and it appeared on the op-ed page in The Post.

Works

He wrote a biography of Dan Rostenkowski, Rostenkowski: The Pursuit of Power and the End of the Old Politics. He also wrote a book with Jules Witcover called "A Heartbeat Away: The Investigation and Resignation of Spiro T. Agnew."

References

External links

Living people
Year of birth missing (living people)
Journalists from Washington, D.C.
The Washington Post people